The FIA WTCR Race of the Netherlands is a round of the World Touring Car Cup, which is held at Circuit Park Zandvoort near Zandvoort in the Netherlands. It was also part of the World Touring Car Championship during the 2007 season.

The Dutch round was added to the 2007 calendar due to the cancellation of the Race of Mexico, which returned in 2008.

Winners

Netherlands
Netherlands
World Touring Car Cup